Bauta Municipal Museum is a museum located in the 251st avenue in Bauta, Cuba. It was established as a museum on 3 May 1981.

The museum holds collections on history and decorative arts.

See also 
 List of museums in Cuba

References 

Museums in Cuba
Buildings and structures in Artemisa Province
Museums established in 1981
1981 establishments in Cuba
20th-century architecture in Cuba